is a district located in Hidaka Subprefecture, Hokkaido, Japan.

As of 2004, the district has an estimated population of 15,986 and a density of 23.03 persons per km2. The total area is 694.23 km2.

Towns and villages
Urakawa

Districts in Hokkaido